Lawn bowls mixed para-sport pairs at the 2018 Commonwealth Games was held at the Broadbeach Bowls Club in the Gold Coast, Australia from April 5 to 11. A total of 12 athletes from 6 associations participated in the event.

Sectional play
The top four advances to the knockout stage.

Section A

Knockout stage

External links
Results

References

Mixed para-sport pairs